The 1974 Wellington City mayoral election was part of the New Zealand local elections held that same year. In 1974, elections were held for the Mayor of Wellington plus other local government positions including eighteen city councillors. The polling was conducted using the standard first-past-the-post electoral method.

Background
The 1974 election was famous for its close result. With a provisional majority that was small enough to be potentially eroded by special votes the final result was not known for nearly a month following several re-counts due to the closeness of the polling. Michael Fowler had an election night lead of 387 while over 4,000 special votes were cast which ended up being very evenly distributed between the two top contenders. In the end Fowlers majority was reduced by only 20 votes and he was duly declared elected as Wellington's new mayor. Sir Frank Kitts lost the Mayoralty after a record 18 years in the role, though he was still re-elected to the Wellington Harbour Board.

The election saw the entry of the environmentalist Values Party into civic politics in Wellington, making it the second nationwide political party to participate in local elections. The Values Party did better than expected with party founder Tony Brunt elected to the council, the first successful third party candidate in Wellington history. Brunt also stood for Mayor with his candidacy drawing away many left-wing voters from the Labour Party. Outgoing Mayor Frank Kitts was to blame the Values vote for his defeat.

Mayoralty results

Councillor results

 
 
 
 
 
 
 
 
 
 
 
 
 
 
 
 
 
 
 
 
  

 
 
 
 
 
 
 
 
 
 
 
 
 
 
 
 
 
 
 
 
 

 
 

Table footnotes:

References

External links
Cartoon satirizing the closeness of the result

Mayoral elections in Wellington
1974 elections in New Zealand
Politics of the Wellington Region
October 1974 events in New Zealand